Radhika Usha Kiran Prasad  is a Fijian international female lawn bowler.

Bowls career
Prasad won a pairs bronze medal with Litia Tikoisuva at the 1996 World Outdoor Bowls Championship in  Victoria Park in Royal Leamington Spa, England.

She has won five medals at the Asia Pacific Bowls Championships including a gold medal in the 1991 fours, in Kowloon, Hong Kong.

In 2022, she competed in the women's triples and the Women's fours at the 2022 Commonwealth Games.

References

Living people
1955 births
Fijian people of Indian descent
Fijian female bowls players
Bowls players at the 2022 Commonwealth Games